Fundy Royal (formerly known as Royal from 1914 to 1966, Fundy—Royal from 1966 to 2003, and Fundy in 2003-2004) is a federal electoral district in southern New Brunswick, Canada, that has been represented in the House of Commons of Canada since 1917.

The riding roughly covers the area in between the three largest cities in the province; Fredericton, Saint John and Moncton. Included in the riding are the towns of Quispamsis, Hampton, Sussex, St. Martins, Petitcodiac, Salisbury and part of Riverview. Also included are the area around Loch Lomond east of Saint John, and the Kingston Peninsula.

The neighbouring ridings are Saint John—Rothesay, New Brunswick Southwest, Fredericton, Miramichi—Grand Lake, Moncton—Riverview—Dieppe, and Beauséjour.

History
The riding of "Royal" was created in 1914. The name came from the counties of Queens and Kings, of which it was composed.

In 1966, Royal riding was amalgamated with most of Albert County and a rural portion of Saint John County into a new riding, "Fundy—Royal". One parish in Queens county was reapportioned into York—Sunbury at this time. In the 2003 redistribution, it lost almost all of Queens County and a large part of Kings County to other ridings; while gaining western Westmorland County. The riding was renamed "Fundy". This name was changed to "Fundy Royal" in 2004. As per the 2012 federal electoral redistribution, this riding will gain territories from Beauséjour, Saint John and New Brunswick Southwest, and lose a small territory to the new riding of Saint John—Rothesay.

The riding has been one of the most supportive of the Conservatives in the country, returning a member of that party or its predecessors in every election, except for the 1993 election when Liberal Paul Zed won and the 2015 election when Liberal Alaina Lockhart won.

Demographics
According to the Canada 2011 Census; 2013 representation

Ethnic groups: 97.1% White, 1.2% Aboriginal 
Languages: 94.4% English, 4.6% French
Religions: 80.1% Christian (26.2% Catholic, 18.1% Baptist, 11.5% Anglican, 10.8% United Church, 2.7% Pentecostal, 1.3% Presbyterian, 9.5% Other), 19.4% No religion 
Median income (2010): $30,151 
Average income (2010): $37,853

Riding associations

Riding associations are the local branches of the national political parties:

Members of Parliament

This riding has elected the following Members of Parliament:

Election results

Fundy Royal

This riding gained territory from Beauséjour, Saint John and New Brunswick Southwest, and lost a small amount of territory to Saint John—Rothesay.

Fundy

Fundy—Royal

Royal

See also
 List of Canadian federal electoral districts
 Past Canadian electoral districts

References

Notes

External links
Riding history from the Library of Parliament:
Fundy-Royal 1966-2003
Fundy 2003-2004
Fundy Royal 2004-present
Fundy Royal NDP Blog

New Brunswick federal electoral districts
Hampton, New Brunswick
Riverview, New Brunswick